Inxight Software, Inc. was a software company specializing in visualization, information retrieval and natural language processing. It was bought by Business Objects in 2007; Business Objects was in turn acquired by SAP AG in 2008. Founded in 1997, Inxight was headquartered in Sunnyvale, California. It was originally spun out of Xerox PARC.

Products
Inxight offered text analysis products in the form of C++ libraries:

 LinguistX for the identification of stems, parts of speech, and noun phrases.
 Summarizer for the identification of key phrases and key sentences.
 ThingFinder for the identification of entities and grammatical patterns, such as "facts", events, relations, and sentiment. This was built on a proprietary pattern-matching language.
 Categorizer for matching a document to nodes in a taxonomy hierarchy.

And also visualization products:

 StarTree, a hierarchical and graph visualization/navigation tool.
 TableLens, a trend visualization tool for large data sets.
 TimeWall, an event/timeline visualization tool.
This functionality is now available via SAP Hybris YaaS Market and is embedded in various SAP platforms (such as SAP HANA and SAP Data Services).

See also
 Computational linguistics
 Natural language processing
 Named entity recognition

References

External links
 Inxight website - (moved to SAP website)

Software companies based in California
Defunct software companies of the United States
Companies based in Sunnyvale, California
Xerox spin-offs